The British Rail Class 99 is a planned class of dual-mode electro-diesel Co-Co locomotives that will haul freight trains on both electrified and non-electrified lines. It will be based on the Stadler Euro Dual platform.

Specification
These figures exceeds those of the diesel-powered BR Class 66. 

Peter Dearman, writing in Rail Engineer reports that the Class 99 may only be able to deliver  at the rail in diesel mode.

History
In April 2022 Beacon Rail and GB Railfreight signed an agreement for the supply of 30 locomotives to replace Class 66s. Introduction to service is expected in 2025.

References

99
Co-Co locomotives
Electro-diesel locomotives of Great Britain

Stadler Rail rolling stock
Standard gauge locomotives of Great Britain
25 kV AC locomotives